Paul O'Connor (born November 7, 1962) is a former American football guard who played for the Tampa Bay Buccaneers of the National Football League (NFL). He played college football at University of Miami.

References 

1962 births
Living people
Sportspeople from Summit, New Jersey
Players of American football from New Jersey
American football offensive guards
Miami Hurricanes football players
Tampa Bay Buccaneers players